Baldridge Creek is a stream in Forsyth County in the U.S. state of Georgia. It empties into Lake Lanier. The stream headwaters arise northeast of Coal Mountain (at ) and the stream flows southeast paralleling US 19.

Baldridge Creek most likely was named after an individual family of Cherokees which settled near its course. Variant names are "Bald Ridge Creek", "Baldridges Creek" and "Ball Ridge Creek".

References

Rivers of Georgia (U.S. state)
Rivers of Forsyth County, Georgia